Leptotrachelon nevermanni is a species of beetle in the family Carabidae, the only species in the genus Leptotrachelon.

References

Ctenodactylinae